Roman Frigg (born 1972) is a Swiss philosopher, Professor at the London School of Economics and Political Science and director of its Centre for Philosophy of Natural and Social Science. In 2016 he was awarded the Friedrich Wilhelm Bessel Research Award.

Born in Basel, Switzerland, Frigg obtained his MSc in Theoretical Physics at the University of Basel. In 2003 he obtained his PhD in Philosophy at the London School of Economics and Political Science under Nancy Cartwright and Carl Hoefer with the thesis entitled Re-presenting Scientific Representation.

After graduation Frigg started his academic career at the London School of Economics. After some years he was appointed Professor of Philosophy in its Department of Philosophy, Logic and Scientific Method. He is also visiting professor at the Ludwig Maximilian University of Munich at its Munich Centre for Mathematical Philosophy.

Philosophy 
Frigg's philosophy draws from his physics background. He often takes examples from the field to demonstrate how order is emergent, holistic, and contextual by universal and exceptionless laws. For instance, together with Robert Bishop, he explained that there is self-organization and patterns of emergent order in the universe rather than a system being built up just from independently calculated movement of its part. This theory is applied to explain phenomena such as heavenly bodies, global politics, and even family life, among others with the view that a domain is regarded as ordered once its objects are seen as behaving according to a general law.

Along with some philosophers like Gabrielle Contessa and Peter Godfrey-Smith, Frigg also theorizes that there are parallels between theoretical modelling and works of fiction that involve fictional characters. For the philosopher, the best way to understand mathematical models is to approach it as if they were more closely related to literary fictions than to bits of mathematics. This can be demonstrated in the way Frigg draws from Kendall Walton's theory, which offers a framework of understanding games of make-believe and uses it to understand the nature and varieties of representation in the arts of art and fiction. Frigg proposed that scientists' prepared descriptions are analogous to props in games of make believe and that the descriptions do not require imaginings about actual objects but ask us to imagine a model-system. It is believed that this approach addresses the concept of model individuation - that "if models are simply mathematical objects, then when two distinct models use the same mathematics, we will not be able to individuate them as separate objects."

Selected publications 
 Roman Frigg, Re-presenting Scientific Representation. London School of Economics, University of London, September 2003.
 Roman Frigg, Matthew Hunter (eds.). Beyond mimesis and convention: representation in art and science. Springer Netherlands, 2010.

Articles, a selection:

References

External links 
 Roman Frigg Personal website

1972 births
Living people
Swiss philosophers
Philosophers of science
University of Basel alumni
Alumni of the University of London
Academics of the London School of Economics
Swiss male writers
People from Basel-Stadt